Getting Sentimental over Tommy Dorsey is a 1963 album by Jo Stafford. The album was recorded in 1963 and features 11 easy listening classic songs associated with the bandleader Tommy Dorsey. Stafford is accompanied on this album by Nelson Riddle, Billy May and Benny Carter. The album was originally released by Reprise Records, then reissued on CD in 2002 on the Collectables label. Collectables then reissued it again in 2008 as part of a three CD set along with The Best of Jo Stafford and Jo Stafford and Friends. The album was released by Valiant Records in 1963 with the title All Alone and again in the 1970s and 1980s by various record labels, under the title Look At Me Now. This album contains the version of "Whatcha Know Joe" that was featured in the 1993 movie, Dennis the Menace.

Track listing

Side 1
 "The One I Love (Belongs to Somebody Else)" - 2:44
 "I'll Never Smile Again " - 3:20
 "Oh! Look at Me Now!" - 2:25
 "Who Can I Turn To?" - 3:25
 "There Are Such Things" - 2:58
 "I'll Take Tallulah" - 2:50

Side 2
 "Let's Get Away from It All" - 2:44
 "It Started All Over Again" - 3:13
 "Whatcha Know Joe" - 2:41
 "The Night We Called It a Day" - 3:33
 "Yes, Indeed" - 2:34

References

1963 albums
Jo Stafford albums
Reprise Records albums
Tommy Dorsey tribute albums
Collectables Records albums